Tang-e Anar-e Sofla (also Romanized as Tang-e Anār-e Soflá) is a village in Poshteh-ye Zilayi Rural District, Sarfaryab District, Charam County, Kohgiluyeh and Boyer-Ahmad Province, Iran. At the 2006 census, its population was 63, in 16 families.

References 

Populated places in Charam County